Sonnen is a municipality in Bavaria, Germany. Sonnen may also refer to
Sonnen GmbH, a German renewable energy company
Chael Sonnen (born 1977), American mixed martial artist and analyst
Marc Sonnen (born 1988), American basketball player
Sønnen fra Amerika, a 1957 Danish family film